Choue Chung-won (조정원,趙正源), born December 20, 1947, is the President of the World Taekwondo Federation elected since 2004.

Career 
Choue had been in World Taekwondo since 1999. He started the Taekwondo Humanitarian Foundation project and had hold various position one as the chairman Board if Trustee of the foundation, he participate and sustained personal investment of international sports and currently he is the Honorary President of the Taekwondo Peace Corps and the Korea Olympic Committee advisor. Choue was since in 2006 president of the GCS International, UN ECOSOC and as the chairman of the Korea Fair Play Committee.

Education 
He graduated with a bachelor in Economics from the Kyung Hee University in 1970 and Masters from the Fairleigh Dickinson University for International Politics in 1974. In 1984, he obtained a PhD from the Katholieke Universiteit Leuven, Belgium.

Notes

External links 
 
 

Living people
1947 births
KU Leuven alumni
Fairleigh Dickinson University alumni
Kyung Hee University alumni
President of the World Taekwondo Federation
Sports executives and administrators